"Carry On" is a song recorded by British singer Lisa Stansfield for her 2014 album, Seven. It was written by Stansfield and her husband Ian Devaney, and produced by Devaney and Snowboy. "Carry On" was announced as the second single on 10 January 2014 and premiered on Ken Bruce's BBC Radio 2 show on 13 January 2014. The music video premiered on 31 January 2014. The digital single was released in Germany on 14 February 2014 and the 7" single in the United Kingdom on 21 April 2014. In October 2014, Andy Lewis Remix of "Carry On" was included on the re-release of Seven, titled Seven+. Stansfield performed the song during her Seven Tour.

Track listings
Promotional single
"Carry On" (Radio Mix) – 3:39 
"Carry On" (Album Version) – 4:07

German digital single
"Carry On" (Ash Howes Radio Mix) – 3:39 
"Carry On" – 4:07

UK 7" single
"Carry On" (Andy Lewis Remix) – 3:49
"Carry On" (Andy Lewis Instrumental) – 3:49

Charts

Credits and personnel

Songwriting – Lisa Stansfield, Ian Devaney
Production – Ian Devaney, Snowboy
Mixing – Peter Mokran
Engineers – Stephen Boyce-Buckley, Jay Glover, Robbie Nelson
Piano – Ian Devaney
Hammond – Dave Oliver
Percussion – Snowboy
Guitars – Al Cherry
Drums – Davide Giovannini
Bass – Gary Crockett
Trumpets – John Thirkell
Saxophones – Mickey Donnelly
Strings – The London Telefilmonic Orchestra 
Horns arrangement – Ian Devaney, John Thrikell
Strings arrangement and conductor – Richard Cottle

Release history

References

Lisa Stansfield songs
2014 singles
2014 songs
Songs written by Lisa Stansfield
Songs written by Ian Devaney